Andrew D. M. Pettegree is a British historian and an expert on the European Reformation, the history of the book and media transformations.  he holds a professorship at St Andrews University, where he is the director of the Universal Short Title Catalogue Project. He is the founding director of the St Andrews Reformation Studies Institute.

Life and work 
His schooling took place at Oundle School. Educated at Oxford University, Pettegree held Research Fellowships at the Universities of Hamburg and Cambridge before moving to St Andrews in 1986.

In 1991 he was named the founding director of the St Andrews Reformation Studies Institute.

His early work was mostly concentrated on the subject of sixteenth-century immigrant communities.

In 2010 he published an interpretative work reassessing the early impact of the printing press, The Book in the Renaissance.  In this he suggests that to understand the impact of print we must look beyond the most notable and celebrated books of the day, and consider the more mundane projects that underpinned the economics of the print era – the "cheap print" of pamphlets and broadsheets. The Book in the Renaissance was nominated one of the New York Times notable books of 2010, and won the Phyllis Goodhart Gordan book prize of the Renaissance Society of America.

In March 2014, Pettegree published The Invention of News: How the World Came to Know About Itself, which was well-received. This charts the development of a commercial culture of news in ten countries over the five centuries before the daily newspaper emerged as the dominant form of news delivery at the beginning of the nineteenth century. The book demonstrates that this period was, like our own, a rich, multi-media environment of manuscript and print, correspondence and conversation, gossip and song. It shows in particular that newspapers were in some respects the least functional part of this system.

In 2015 The Invention of News won Harvard University's Goldsmith Prize.  This prize, awarded annually by the Shorenstein Center for Media, Politics and Public Policy at the Kennedy School of Government, honours the book that best fulfils the objective of improving democratic governance through an examination of the intersection between the media, politics and public policy.

In 2015 Pettegree published a study of Martin Luther's use and mastery of the printed media. The Washington Post described this as "a remarkable story, thoroughly researched and clearly told, and one sure to change the way we think about the early Reformation."

Together with Arthur der Weduwen, in 2019 Pettegree published a book about the publishing industry in the Netherlands in the Dutch Golden Age.

Other roles
Pettegree has held visiting fellowships at All Souls College, Oxford, the Scaliger Institute at Leiden University, Netherlands, and at the Centre for Renaissance and Reformation Research at the University of Toronto.  He is a former Vice-President of the Royal Historical Society.

Publications
 The Library. A Fragile History, w. Arthur der Weduwen (Profile Books, 2021)
 News, Business and Public Information. Advertisements and Announcements in Dutch and Flemish Newspapers, 1620-1675, w. Arthur der Weduwen (Brill, 2020)
 The Dutch Republic and the Birth of Modern Advertising, w. Arthur der Weduwen (Brill, 2020)
 The Bookshop of the World. Searching for markets in the Dutch Golden Age, w.  Arthur der Weduwen (Yale University Press, 2019)
 Brand Luther: 1517, Printing and the making of the Reformation (Penguin USA, 2015)
 The Invention of News: How the World Came to Know About Itself (Yale University Press, 2014)
 The Book in the Renaissance (Yale University Press, 2010)
 The French Book and the European Book World (Brill, 2007)
 Reformation and the Culture of Persuasion (Cambridge University Press, 2005)
 Europe in the Sixteenth Century  (Blackwell, 2002)
 Emden and the Dutch Revolt: Exile and the Development of Reformed Protestantism  (Oxford University Press, 1992)
 Foreign Protestant communities in sixteenth-century London, (Oxford University Press, 1986)
 The Early Reformation in Europe  (Cambridge University Press, 1992)
 (edited with A Duke and Gillian Lewis)  Calvinism in Europe, 1540-1610: A Collection of Documents  (Manchester University Press, 1992)
 (edited with A Duke and Gillian Lewis)  Calvinism in Europe, 1540-1620  (Cambridge University Press, 1994)
 Marian Protestantism: Six Studies (St Andrews Studies in Reformation History, 1995, 1996)
 The Reformation World (ed.) (Routledge, 2000)

Bibliographies
 Andrew Pettegree, Malcolm Walsby & Alexander Wilkinson (eds.), French Vernacular Books. Books Published in the French Language before 1601, 2 vols. (Leiden: Brill, 2007)
 Andrew Pettegree & Malcolm Walsby (eds.), Netherlandish Books. Books Published in the Low Countries and Dutch Books Printed Abroad before 1601, 2 vols. (Leiden: Brill, 2011)
 Andrew Pettegree & Malcolm Walsby (eds.), French Books III & IV. Books published in France before 1601 in Latin and Languages other than French, 2 vols. (Leiden: Brill, 2011)

References

External links
 official webpage of the Universal Short Title Catalogue Project

Reformation historians
Living people
Year of birth missing (living people)
Alumni of Merton College, Oxford
Fellows of the Royal Historical Society
Fellows of the British Academy
People educated at Oundle School